Park So-hyun (born February 11, 1971) is a South Korean actress. She has a syndicated talk radio show Love Game, aired via the SBS Power FM since 1999. She also participated in variety show We Got Married.

On September 20, 2016, Park So-hyun and VIXX member Leo collaborated to celebrate SBS Power FM’s 20th Anniversary and released the song "That's All" as part of SBS Power FM's Anniversary song project.

Filmography

Television series

Film

Variety Show

Web shows

Awards and nominations

References

External links
Park So-hyun at New-Able Entertainment
 

1971 births
Living people
South Korean television actresses
South Korean film actresses
South Korean television personalities
South Korean radio presenters
Ewha Womans University alumni
Sungkyunkwan University alumni
South Korean women radio presenters